My Brilliant Career is a 1979 Australian period drama film directed by Gillian Armstrong, and starring Judy Davis, Sam Neill, and Wendy Hughes. Based on the 1901 novel of the same name by Miles Franklin, it follows a young woman in rural, late-19th-century Australia whose aspirations to become a writer are impeded first by her social circumstance, and later by a budding romance.

Filmed in the Monaro region, New South Wales in 1978, My Brilliant Career was released in Australia in August 1979, and later premiered in the United States at the New York Film Festival. It received significant critical acclaim, and was nominated for numerous AACTA Awards, winning three, while Davis won the BAFTA Award for Best Actress in a Leading Role. In the United States, it received nominations for the Academy Award for Best Costume Design, and the Golden Globe Award for Best Foreign Film.

Contemporarily, the film is regarded as being part of the Australian New Wave of cinema. In 2018, it underwent restoration by the Australian National Sound and Film Archive, and was issued on Blu-ray and DVD by the Criterion Collection the following year.

Plot
In 1897 in rural Australia, Sybylla, a headstrong, free-spirited young woman, dreams of a better life to the detriment of helping run her family's country farm. Considered a larrikin by her family, Sybylla dreams of having a career in writing or the performing arts. Her parents, upset by her notions of grandeur and believing her to be stalling her life, inform Sybylla that they can no longer afford to keep her in the household. They send her to board with her wealthy maternal grandmother in hopes of teaching her socially accepted manners and behaviour.

Upon arriving, Sybylla swiftly feels out of place in her new environs. She is soon courted by two local men, jackaroo Frank Hawdon, whom she ignores, and well-to-do childhood friend Harry Beecham, of whom she grows increasingly fond. Sybylla is sent to spend time at the Beecham estate, and her feelings increase toward Harry. She returns to her grandmother's home when Harry is sent on a tour of their properties, with everyone on both estates coyly approving of their romance. Sybylla's Aunt Helen warns her against Harry's courtship, and advises that Sybylla marry for friendship rather than love.

Frank attempts to derail Harry and Sybylla's budding relationship by sparking rumours, which leads to increasing tensions between the two. Harry and Sybylla take turns attempting to make the other jealous at a ball, leading to Harry's surprise proposal. Sybylla gruffly rejects him, to everyone's surprise. Harry later reveals his rush was to protect Sybylla from his potential financial collapse. Sybylla counters by asking Harry to wait while she discovers herself, and asks him to delay his proposal for two years.

Sybylla is summoned by her grandmother, and is told she must take a job as governess and housekeeper to the indigent family of an illiterate neighbour to whom her father owes money. Working in squalor, she manages to teach the children to read using the newspapers and book pages wallpapering their home. To her delight, Sybylla is eventually sent home when the parents become incorrectly convinced that she is wooing their eldest son. Harry visits and proposes again, but Sybylla again rejects him, stating her intent to become a writer; she tenderly explains that a marriage between the two would be emotionally damaging.

Returning to her family's farm, Sybylla completes a manuscript of her first novel, My Brilliant Career, which she hopefully mails off to a Scottish publishing house.

Cast

Production

Development
Margaret Fink had purchased the rights to Miles Franklin's novel of the same name, and the Australian Film Development Corporation suggested she hire a writer to adapt it and Fink selected Eleanor Witcombe. Gillian Armstrong met Fink while working as an assistant art director on the latter's The Removalists (1975) and Fink was impressed with her short film "A Hundred a Day". She subsequently hired Armstrong to direct. Greater Union invested $200,000 in the project, the NSW Film Corporation invested $450,000 with the balance coming from private investors.

Armstrong brought in editor Ted Ogden to work on the script, which caused tension between her and Witcombe. For a time Witcombe threatened to take her name off the credits but ultimately decided not to. Commenting on her aspirations for the film, Armstrong said in 1979: "I wanted to make the statement that the heroine is a full woman who can develop her talents and have a career. I didn't want to reinforce the old stereotypes that a woman who has a career only does so only because she can't get a man."

Casting
The role of Sybylla was cast in January 1978 but when the actress was tested in costume it was felt she was wrong for the role. Judy Davis was cast instead; it was her first leading role.

Filming
Principal photography of My Brilliant Career took place over eight weeks in October and November 1978 in the Monaro region of New South Wales. Some scenes were shot at the Ryrie homestead at Michelago, New South Wales with Camden Park Estate featuring as Harry Beecham's 'Five Bob Downs' property. The film's theme music was an arrangement from "Of Foreign Lands and People" from Robert Schumann's Kinderszenen. Davis plays her on-screen piano part herself. Other pieces of classical music used in the film include arrangements of "Träumerei" from Kinderszenen, and of the Piano Quartet in E minor by Schumann.

Release
My Brilliant Career was shown at the Cannes Film Festival in 1979 and received a warm reception. The film had its international debut in New York City at the New York Film Festival on 1 February 1980, followed by a release in Japan on 2 January 1982, and in Poland on 23 July 2007 at Era New Horizons Film Festival.

Box office
My Brilliant Career grossed $3,052,000 at the box office in Australia.

Critical response
Charles Champlin of the Los Angeles Times lauded the film for its "resolute and courageous ending," also deeming it "beautifully written, photographed, directed, and acted." The New York Times Janet Maslin also praised the film, noting in her review: "My Brilliant Career doesn't need to trumpet either its or its heroine's originality this loudly. The facts speak for themselves—and so does the radiance with which Miss Armstrong and Miss Davis invest so many memorable moments."

It has an 86% approval rating on Rotten Tomatoes from 21 reviews.

Accolades

Home media
Blue Underground released My Brilliant Career in a two-disc special edition DVD in 2005. A Blu-ray edition was subsequently issued by Blue Underground in 2009.

In 2018, the Australian National Film and Sound Archive restored the film, and this restoration was subsequently issued on DVD and Blu-ray in 2019 by the U.S. home media company the Criterion Collection.

Legacy
My Brilliant Career has been noted by film historians as a part of the Australian New Wave of cinema. In a retrospective essay celebrating the film's inclusion in the Criterion Collection, film scholar Carrie Rickey notes that both the film and its source novel alive have "become part of Australian identity."

Though Judy Davis received critical acclaim for her performance, director Gillian Armstrong stated that Davis was never fond of the film and disliked her character.

See also
 Cinema of Australia

References

Sources

External links
 
 My Brilliant Career, ozmovies.com.au
 My Brilliant Career at Australian Screen from the National sound and film archive
 

1979 films
1979 drama films
Australian coming-of-age drama films
1970s coming-of-age drama films
Films based on Australian novels
Films about writers
Films directed by Gillian Armstrong
Films set in New South Wales
Films set in colonial Australia
Films shot in Australia
Australian independent films
1979 directorial debut films
1979 independent films
1970s feminist films
1970s English-language films